Butsaran Thongchiew (September 21, 1990 – June 14, 2019) was a Thai singer, actress. She was born in Samut Sakhon Province, Thailand. Her father is a movie director, Viroj Thongchiew. Namtarn graduated from College of Music, Mahidol University. She was best known as a competitor of The Star 5 in 2009 and an actress of "Pookong Jaosane" as "Lieutenant Run" a comedy TV series on One31.

Career 
Butsaran attended a vocal talent competition TV show "The Star season 5" audition round in November, 2008 and qualified to final round. She was eliminated in second round. After eliminating on The Star 5, she continued working in entertainment path.

Songs 
 Peur Dao Duang Nan - OST. The Star season 5
 Pa sa jai (Heart language) the original soundtrack of a comedy TV series "Pookong Jaosane"
 Meur Rao Mee Gun - OST. The Star season 5 (various artist)
 Medley - Mai yak rok ft. Grand, A and Radklao
 Yang rak gun yoo chai mai OST. Kam vela ha rak (Time to find love)
 Rueng mun jam pen - OST. Kam vela ha rak (Time to find love)
 Lover Coaster-Windy sugar ft. Win Nimman, the last performance of Numtarn

Music Videos 
 Tua Tiew Deaw (Single ticket), Pra derm, Roop Ros Klin Seang - Sopon Panthong
 Pa sa jai  (Own music video)
 Lover Coaster - Windy sugar ft. Win Nimman

Movie(s)
 Tewada Ta Ja Teng - Sahamongkol Film International

TV Series 
 Poo kong jao sane as Lieutenant Run on One31 HD
 Kam vela ha rak (Time to find love) as Pin
 We born in reign of The King Rama IX, a special episode of Poo Kong Jao Sane
 Por Pla Lai as Mint

Concert 
 The Star 5 concert

Death 
Numtarn suddenly "started bleeding heavily through her nose and mouth while at home in her native province of Samut Sakhon on Tuesday June 11, 2019. She was rushed to Samut Sakhon Hospital and transferred to Siriraj in Bangkok on the next day. She had to be resuscitated multiple times." After she was admitted to Siriraj Hospital, physicians and other prominent physicians held a press conference about the situation of Numtarn that 'unprecedented' and the physicians team are now investigating. On Friday June 14, 2019 2.17 A.M. her father, Viroj had written on his Facebook account that Numtarn was to 'die a peaceful death'. Her funeral was held in Wat Pomwicheanchotikaram temple in Amphoe Mueng, Samut Sakhon Province.

References 

1990 births
2019 deaths
Butsaran Thongchiew
Butsaran Thongchiew
Butsaran Thongchiew
Deaths from blood disease